Zacharias Wagenaer (also known as Wagener, Wagenaar and Wagner) (10 May 1614 – 12 October 1668) was a German-born Dutch clerk, illustrator, merchant, member of the Court of Justice, opperhoofd of Deshima and the only German governor of the Dutch Cape Colony. In 35 years he traveled over four continents.

Biography

Early life and career
Zacharias was the son of a Saxonian judge and a painter. In 1633 he traveled from Dresden via Hamburg to Amsterdam. There he worked for Willem Blaeu. Within a year he enlisted as a soldier in the armed forces of the Dutch West India Company to serve in "New Holland" (Dutch Brazil) in 1634. Three years later, he was hired as a writer by the newly arrived governor of the colony, Count John Maurice, Prince of Nassau-Siegen. In Recife he kept a sort of diary with 109 water-colour drawings of curious fish, strange birds, useful and harmful animals, lovely tasty fruit and nasty, poisonous worms and big, brown or black people, published as "Thier-Buch". There are pictures of the smooth hammerhead, cutlassfish, slender filefish, Serranidae, and Cirripedia. On 1 April 1641, he left Dutch Brazil, and arrived on Texel on 17 June. He traveled back to Dresden arriving 12 October. After four months, he left Dresden to return to the Netherlands arriving at Amsterdam on 29 March 1642, and took a position with the Dutch East India Company (commonly abbreviated to VOC).

Dutch East Indies

On 29 September 1642 he sailed for the Indies as an apprentice officer. In the next year he became an assistant for the governors Antonie van Diemen and Cornelis van der Lijn; in 1646 he became under-merchant and in 1651 merchant. Three times he became a member of the Court of Justice at Batavia. In 1653 he went on a mission to Canton to open up again trade relations, which proved fruitless, due to a civil war after the Fall of the Ming Dynasty.

In 1657 he rose to the rank of opperhoofd (senior official) of the VOC at the small island in Nagasaki bay in the Japanese island of Kyushu, Dejima. He traveled to the capital Edo in a tributary mission and escaped from a burning city, which started on 2 March 1657. (There is a drawing from his hand in the Edo-Tokyo Museum.) In 1659, as one of the first "opperhoofden", he ordered a dinner service, consisting of 200 pieces. Wagener made the design of this Japanese porcelain, according to the European taste white and blue, with many flowers.

In 1660 Wagner was involved in the peace negotiations with the sultan of Makassar. The port had about 2000 Portuguese traders and for years threatened the Dutch spice trade on the Moluccas. The next year he was head of the Public Works in Batavia.

Dutch Cape Colony
In 1662 he went to Cape of Good Hope with his small family, five slaves and two horses. He followed Jan van Riebeeck as a governor on 6 May. Riebeeck left the next day. In December 1663 he asked Batavia to send him some pottery from Persia. He negotiated with the Hottentots about cattle for the Company. By abstaining from further expeditions Wagener could pursue his policy to refrain from an interference in tribal disputes, and to keep strictly neutral. After five years studying, the German student Georg Friedrich Wreede wrote a compendium of the Dutch and Hottentot language. Wagener appointed him in Mauritius.

Wagener was one of the five people laying the foundation of the Castle of Good Hope, which was started in August 1665. He constructed a waterbasin, supplying the ships with fresh water, a hospital, a school and a church. In 1666 his wife Anna Auxbrebis, whom he had married in 1648, died.

Later life
On 27 September 1666 he resigned and Wagener went back to Batavia with his stepdaughter. He sold his slaves from Bengal. With presents he went to see the susuhunan of Mataram, who refused to trade with the VOC. While his knowledge of the Malay or Javanese language wasn't very good, the mission turned out to be fruitless; Wagener visited Japara afterwards. The year after he sailed back to Amsterdam as a vice-admiral, and in ill health.  He was buried on 16 October 1668 in the Old Church.

An excerpt of his diary was translated from the High Dutch into English and published in 1704 and 1732. A manuscript with fundamentally the same excerpt—but in German—has been a part of the Collection of Prints, Drawings and Photographs of the Dresden State Art Collections since at least the beginning of the 18th century.

Terms as opperhoofd
Wagner served two terms as opperhoofd in alternation with Joan Boucheljon:

 Joan Bouchelion: 23 October 16551 November 1656
 Zacharias Wagenaer [Wagener]: 1 November 165627 October 1657
 Joan Bouchelion: 27 October 165723 October 1658
 Zacharias Wagenaer [Wagener]: 22 October 16584 November 1659
 Joan Bouchelion: 4 November 165926 October 1660

Work

Gallery

Notes

References

Further reading

1614 births
1668 deaths
Dutch chiefs of factory in Japan
Artists from Dresden
17th-century Dutch colonial governors
Commanders of the Dutch Cape Colony
Burials at the Oude Kerk, Amsterdam
Sailors on ships of the Dutch West India Company
Dutch slave owners